Bonnie Banane (born 1992) is a French alternative pop singer based in Paris. Since the release of her first track Muscles in 2012, she has worked alongside producers and artists such as Walter Mecca, Myth Syzer, Gautier Vizioz, Flavien Berger and Varnish La Piscine. She is known for her eccentric music videos, collaborations and appearances on the COLORS platform.

Style and influences 
Banane blends R&B, soul with snippets of hip-hop and electronics. Her music could be described as experimental pop or alternative R&B.

Dicography 
Source:

Albums

EP 

 Greatest Hits (2013)
 Rapt (2013)
 Soeur Nature (2015)

Singles

As lead artist 

 Statue (2016)
 Mouvements (2017)
 Feu au lac (2018)
 La Clef ft. Myth Slazer
 La Lune & Le Soleil (2020)
 Flash (2020)
 Limites (2020)
 Mauvaise Foi (2020)

As featured artist 

 Pollen The Hop ft. Bonnie Banane & Edge
 Le Code Myth Syzer ft. Bonnie Banane, Ichon & Monk

References

French pop musicians
1992 births
Living people
Félix Award winners